Listen Without Prejudice Vol. 1 is the second solo studio album by the English singer-songwriter George Michael, released on 3 September 1990 by Columbia Records (Epic Records in the UK). The album was Michael's final album of all-new material on Columbia until 2004's Patience. Listen Without Prejudice was a stark departure from Michael's previous album, 1987's Faith, with largely acoustic instrumentation and a sombre intensity in many of the lyrics and melodies. While the album topped the UK Albums Chart, disappointing sales in the United States led to Michael's legal battles against Sony Music, in which he accused the corporation of not fully supporting him as an artist.

Listen Without Prejudice was reissued across a number of formats on 20 October 2017 and again topped the UK Albums Chart, 27 years after it first reached number one on the chart.

Production
After the massive success of George Michael's 1987 album Faith, expectations for his follow-up album were also high. Michael wanted to be taken more seriously as a songwriter, which resulted in a more thoughtful, often moody recording.

Listen Without Prejudice Vol. 1 is largely devoted to ballads and folk-styled rock songs, although there are a few dance tracks like "Freedom" and "Soul Free". There was also a remix of "Freedom" that incorporated elements of Soul II Soul's "Back to Life", which was released as a twelve-inch single and received a good deal of club play. Like Faith, each track was produced and arranged by Michael himself.

Release
Listen Without Prejudice Vol. 1 was released in September 1990. The album sold approximately eight million copies worldwide, a disappointing number compared to the 20 million copies of Faith. Sales were particularly poor in the United States, where Faith had been the best-selling album of 1988. At two million copies sold, Listen Without Prejudice was a commercial disappointment for a successful artist. The album entered the Billboard 200 at number 22 and peaked at number two, blocked from the top by MC Hammer's Please Hammer Don't Hurt 'Em. The album spent the rest of 1990 in the top ten, with a total of 42 weeks on the entire chart—fewer than half the 87 weeks spent by Faith.

In the United Kingdom, the album was a huge success, eclipsing sales of Faith. Listen Without Prejudice debuted on the UK Albums Chart at number one, where it remained for a week. It stayed at number two for the following two weeks. It spent 34 consecutive weeks in the top 20, and jumped from number 13 to number three in its 24th week. It spent a total of 88 weeks on the chart, and was certified quadruple platinum by the British Phonographic Industry on 2 January 1992.

The follow-up album Listen Without Prejudice Vol. 2 (ostensibly scheduled to follow in June 1991) was scrapped for reasons known only to Michael and his record company. Three of the tracks intended for that album appear on the 1992 charity compilation Red Hot + Dance, while a fourth ("Crazy Man Dance") turned up on the B-side of that compilation's first single, "Too Funky".

Singles
The first single from Listen Without Prejudice Vol. 1, "Praying for Time", was released in August 1990, reaching number six on the UK Singles Chart and number one on the US Billboard Hot 100—Michael's final US number one as a solo artist. 

The second single (third in the US), "Waiting for That Day", was issued a month after the album's release. Owing to a borrowed lyric from The Rolling Stones' hit "You Can't Always Get What You Want", co-writer credits were given to Mick Jagger and Keith Richards. It reached number 23 in the UK, and, after being released there in spring 1991, number 27 in the US. 

In the US, "Mother's Pride", the "Waiting for That Day" B-side, reached number 46; given its subject matter, it received considerable airplay on American radio during the Gulf War.

The album's third single (second in the US), "Freedom! '90", became one of Michael's signature songs. It was a great success in the US, where it reached number eight and earned a gold certification from the Recording Industry Association of America. It charted lower in Michael's homeland, where it peaked at number 28. 

The fourth single, "Heal the Pain", peaked at number 31 in the UK in February 1991. 

The fifth single from Listen Without Prejudice, "Cowboys and Angels", entered the UK Singles Chart in March and peaked at number 45. 

"Soul Free" was commercially released as the sixth and final single in Australia and Japan, in Australia it peaked at number 95 on the ARIA chart.

Michael refused to appear in the music videos for the album's singles. Accordingly, the video for "Praying for Time" consisted of the song's lyrics projected onto a dark background, while the video for "Freedom! '90", directed by David Fincher, featured several supermodels lip syncing its lyrics, and the destruction by fire and explosion of several icons from Michael's recent Faith period.

Reissue
Listen Without Prejudice Vol. 1 was reissued on 20 October 2017 as Listen Without Prejudice / MTV Unplugged. The reissue was first announced in September 2016. The 2CD version includes the original remastered album on the first disc, and Michael's MTV Unplugged concert, recorded at 3 Mills Studios, London on 11 October 1996, on the second disc. MTV Unplugged contains performances of "I Can't Make You Love Me" and "The Strangest Thing" that are identical to those previously released as B-sides to the single "Older", and the 2017 version of "Fantasy", reworked by Nile Rodgers and released as a single in September 2017. 

The 3CD+DVD deluxe edition includes two more discs: a CD with B-sides, remixes and rarities, and a DVD with a documentary and music videos. Rarities on the third disc include: "If You Were My Woman" (recorded live at the Nelson Mandela 70th Birthday Tribute concert in 1988 and featured on the "Praying for Time" single), "Crazy Man Dance", and "Do You Really Want to Know" and "Happy" (from Red Hot + Dance). The original remastered album was also reissued on vinyl. Listen Without Prejudice / MTV Unplugged entered the UK Albums Chart at number one with first-week sales of 56,088 copies, 27 years after the original album first topped the chart.

Critical reception

Listen Without Prejudice Vol. 1 was met with critical acclaim from music critics upon release. Reviewing the album for Rolling Stone, James Hunter stated that the album mostly "succeeds in its effort to establish Michael's seriousness and deliver him from caricature." Los Angeles Times critic Chris Willman wrote that, "some self-seriousness aside", Listen Without Prejudice "is an impressive piece of work in which Michael's rich feel for melodies and instinctively perfect production skills have finally met up with songs that have the ring of personal, not commercial, passion." Greg Kot of the Chicago Tribune particularly complimented the album's spare sound, which he viewed as a welcome contrast to the more dance-leaning music dominating contemporary hit radio.

Entertainment Weeklys Greg Sandow was less enthusiastic, finding Listen Without Prejudice less "vital" and "fun" than Faith, "and, for all its noble sentiment, entirely unchallenging". Robert Christgau of The Village Voice said that Michael's retreat from dance music resulted in less interesting songs, and asserted that Michael "doesn't know as much about stardom as he thinks".

Listen Without Prejudice won the award for British Album of the Year at the 1991 Brit Awards.

Legacy
In 2010, Listen Without Prejudice Vol. 1 was included in the book 1001 Albums You Must Hear Before You Die. In a positive appraisal of the album's 2017 reissue, Pitchfork writer Alfred Soto situated the album in the context of the then-burgeoning HIV/AIDS pandemic: "[George Michael] understood black music as the product of a familiarity with death leavened by the banalities of earth: love, sex, comfort. Something was happening that autumn to gay artists closeted from their fans. In October [1990], Neil Tennant and Chris Lowe released Behaviour, the quietest album of the Pet Shop Boys' career. The unceasing piling up of bodies killed by HIV had made, for the moment, the bacchanal into a gauche if not repulsive gesture of sentimentality." According to Soto: "For those of us too young for the plague years—who can imagine, at least, a life lived instead of convulsing in agony on a hospital bed—chastising Michael for leaning on elegies and ballads in 1990 strikes me as glib. In its original form, Listen Without Prejudice Vol. 1 was the follow-up that Faith demanded; in this new incarnation, it's a miscellany unruffled by notions of coherence, an attempt to make art out of George Michael's quarrels with himself."

Track listing
All tracks written and produced by George Michael, except where noted.

Listen Without Prejudice / MTV Unplugged

Notes
The track "Waiting for That Day" includes a sample of James Brown's "Funky Drummer" drum break, which was also used in "Freedom! '90". Heretofore regarded as a hip-hop technique, this was deemed unorthodox for a pop song. The song's final line comes from The Rolling Stones' classic "You Can't Always Get What You Want".
The album cover image is a cropped section of the 1940 photograph Crowd at Coney Island by Weegee.

Personnel
George Michael – vocals, keyboards (1, 6, 9), acoustic guitar (4, 7, 8), keyboard bass (2, 5), bass guitar (4, 9), programming, percussion, backing vocals, horn arrangements, production
Chris Porter – mix engineer
Danny Cummings – drums, percussion
Tony Patler – keyboards
Ian Thomas – drums, percussion
Deon Estus – bass guitar, backing vocals
Phil Palmer – acoustic guitar, electric guitar
Chris Cameron – keyboards, piano, horn arrangements, string arrangements
Emily Burridge – cello
Andy Hamilton – saxophone
Alfia Nakipbekova – cello
Pete Gleadall – sequencer, programming
Shirley Lewis – backing vocals
Bradford Branson – inner photography

Charts

Weekly charts

Year-end charts

Decade-end charts

Certifications and sales

Release history

See also
 Panayiotou v. Sony Music Entertainment (UK) Ltd.

References

1990 albums
George Michael albums
Columbia Records albums
Brit Award for British Album of the Year
MTV Unplugged albums